The Karamay fire occurred on 8 December 1994 when the students were entertaining the visiting officials at a theatre in Karamay, Xinjiang, China. This fire remains the most notorious fire in China for the fact that the students were ordered to remain seated to allow the visiting officials to walk out first when the fire happened. The fire killed 325, including 288 schoolchildren.

Building design 
The Friendship Theatre was built in 1958 following Soviet architecture, renovated starting in 1989 and reentered operation in December 1991. The building had three floors and was originally designed with a capacity of 796 people. The renovation increased it to 810. The soundproofing material was made of asbestos and polyurethane, the curtains were made of cotton. In certain positions, the spotlight was only at a distance of 20 cm from the stage curtains. Due to a lack of awareness on fire safety, the refurbishments of the theatre introduced many flammable objects, such as the seats, which due to being made from artificial fibres, burned well, spread out toxic gasses and proved fatal in the fire to many people.

The fire
On 8 December 1994, 500 schoolchildren were taken to a special variety performance at a theatre in Karamay at Friendship Theatre. Most were aged between 7 and 14.  From the accounts of survivors, it appears that spotlights near the stage either short-circuited, caused the curtain to catch fire spontaneously or fell. The curtain caught fire, then exploded, and fire engulfed the auditorium within a minute or two, and the fire caused a short circuit, shutting all the remaining lights. Various burning objects in the theatre released poisonous gases.

The firefighters who arrived on scene first did not have proper respiratory equipment and were thus unable to enter the hall. The dry powder fire extinguishers in the theatre, though potent against chemical fires, were wholly useless against the fire, high up in the curtains.

"Let the officials leave first"
In 1995, the China Youth Daily was the first to have reported that somebody had asked the students 'let the leaders leave first'. The phrase has since become a catch phrase, meaning the government officials have priority over ordinary folks in times of emergency. For such, this fire remains the most notorious fire in China.

She has since been identified in online articles as Kuang Li, who was vice-director of the state petroleum company’s local education centre, though there has been no official confirmation of this.  The teachers obeyed, and the children remain seated. By the time the about 20 officials had filed out through the only opened emergency exit, when all the other exits remained locked, it was too late. Teachers hurried the pupils out of their seats to other exits, only to find that the emergency exit doors were locked. Parents and survivors alleged that Kuang took refuge in a ladies’ cloakroom that could have sheltered 30 people and barred the doors behind her. A 10-year-old boy said "My teacher asked me to run out of the theatre, but when I stood up the hall was smothered in smoke and fire. The power then cut out. People could see nothing. The place was full of crying and shouting."

Other survivors agreed that while 'let the leaders go first' was indeed said, it was spoken at the beginning of the performance, as a manner of respect to them when the performance ends and China Youth Daily took the original sentence out of context. Notably, in the documentary Karamay, in an interview conducted in the hospital immediately after the fire, none of the interviewees spoke about the students being instructed to let the leaders go first.

Arguably, even if the leaders had left first, it wouldn't have made a difference; the main reason why many people died in front of doors A, B was due to panic. The panic induced irrational thinking, and many people tried to escape the way they entered, inevitably leading to a crush at the A, B doors, while the safer E, F doors were ignored even though they were not blocked in the rush to exit. The anti-robbery bars installed significantly hampered evacuation through windows and other doors.

Fatalities and justice
A total of 325 deaths were reported, with 288 of them being school children.  Most of the 36 adults were teachers. About 100 corpses were heaped up outside the cloakroom.

In 1995, 300 families of the dead and injured sent representatives to the National People’s Congress in Beijing, supposedly the venue for Chinese citizens to seek justice and a fair hearing. They were led off by security guards to a walled government compound, where five buses took them back to the airport. The group were then escorted through special channels to a plane bound for Xinjiang.

A court convicted a total of 13 people.  Four of them, senior officials, were convicted of dereliction of duty and sentenced up to five years in prison. Others were convicted of lesser crimes while Zhao Zheng was acquitted.

Families received compensation of up to 50,589 yuan.
One week after the fire, city officials in Karamay announced plans to demolish the burned out Friendship Theater. This plan was quickly scrapped following protests by residents of Karamay and parents of the deceased children. Three years later, in September 1997, the theater portion of the building was torn down, leaving only the front hall. This unmarked memorial still stands in what is now the People's Park in the center of Karamay.

There is no plaque or memorial anywhere in Karamay that references the deadly fire.

In popular culture
Popular Chinese folk singer Zhou Yunpeng (周云蓬) has compiled a list of Chinese man-made disasters and turned it into a song, and the Karamay fire incident was mentioned in the song, as was the internet catch phrase, "Let the leaders walk out first."()

See also

 Karamay (film)
 List of fires in China

References

1994 disasters in China
Fires in China
1994 fires in Asia
20th century in Xinjiang
Theatre fires
Fire disasters involving barricaded escape routes